The seventeenth series of the Ojarumaru anime series aired from April 1 to November 7, 2014 on NHK for a total of 70 episodes. The series was originally scheduled to premier on March 31, 2014, but got pushed back to April 1 due to NHK airing the National High School Baseball Championship in the series' time slot on that day.

The series' opening theme is "Utahito" (詠人) by Saburō Kitajima. The ending theme is "Da!Da!!Da!!" by The Collectors. Episodes 1454 through 1458, and 1479 through 1483 were released on DVD by Nippon Columbia across two compilation DVDs (that also includes selected episodes from Series 13 through 16) simultaneously on November 19, 2014.

Episodes

References

External links
 Series 17 episode list

Ojarumaru episode lists